South 24 Parganas (Pron: pɔrɡɔnɔs; abbr. 24 PGS (S)), or sometimes South Twenty Four Parganas and Dakshin 24 Parganas, is a district in the Indian state of West Bengal, headquartered in Alipore. It is the largest district of West Bengal by area and second largest by population. It is the sixth most populous district in India (out of 640). On one side of the district there is the urban fringe of Kolkata, and on the other the remote riverine villages in the Sundarbans.

History
Originally, the capital of Raja Bikramaditya and Maharaja Pratapaditya was at Dhumghat. Later it was transferred to Ishwaripur (Originated from the name Jeshoreshwaripur). Maharaja Pratapaditya declared the independence of South Bengal from the Mughal Empire.

Pratapaditya's father Shrihari (Shridhar), a Kayastha, was an influential officer in the service of Daud Khan Karrani. Upon the fall of Daud, he fled with the government treasure in his custody. He then, in 1574, set up a kingdom for himself in the marshy land to the extreme south of Khulna district and took the title of Maharaja. Pratapaditya inherited the kingship in 1574. The Baharistan and travel diary of Abdul Latif, and the contemporary European writers, testify to Pratapaditya's personal ability, political pre-eminence, material resources and martial strength, particularly in war-boats. His territories covered the greater part of what is now included in the greater Jessore, Khulna and Barisal districts. He established his capital at Dhumghat, a strategic position at the confluence of the Jamuna and Ichhamati rivers.

Among the Bengal zamindars, Pratapaditya was the first to send his envoy to Islam Khan Chisti with a large gift to win the favour of the Mughals, and then, in 1609, tendered personal submission to the Subahdar. He promised military assistance and personal service in the Mughal campaign against Musa Khan, a pledge he did not keep. To punish Pratapaditya for his disloyalty and to subjugate his territory, a large expedition was launched under the command of Ghiyas Khan, which soon reached Salka, near the confluence of the Jamuna and Ichhamati, in 1611. Pratapaditya equipped a strong army and fleet and placed them under expert officers. His eldest son Udayaditya constructed an almost impregnable fort at Salka with natural barriers on three sides. In battle, the Jessore fleet gained an initial advantage but the imperial army cut off the Jessore fleet, made a breach in its ranks and broke its unity and discipline. In the melee that followed, the admiral, Khwaja Kamal, was killed. Udayaditya lost heart and hastily fled to his father, narrowly escaping capture.

Pratapaditya prepared himself to fight a second time from a new base near the confluence of the Kagarghat canal and the Jamuna river. He constructed a fort and gathered all his available forces there. The imperialists began the battle on January, 1612 with an attack on the Jessore fleet, compelling it to seek shelter beneath the fort. But their advance was checked by the heavy cannonade of the Jessore artillery. However, a sudden attack by the imperialists completely defeated the Jessore fleet and they fell upon the fort with elephants in front, compelling Pratapaditya to evacuate the fort and retreat.

This second defeat sealed the fate of Pratapaditya. At Kagarghat he tendered submission to Ghiyas Khan, who personally escorted Pratapaditya to Islam Khan at Dhaka. The Jessore king was put in chains and his kingdom was annexed. Pratapaditya was kept confined at Dhaka. No authentic information is available regarding his last days, however, he probably died as a prisoner at Benares, on his way to Delhi.

Administration
The district comprises five subdivisions: Alipore Sadar, Baruipur, Canning, Diamond Harbour and Kakdwip.

Alipore is the district headquarters. There are 33 police stations, 29 community development blocks, 7 municipalities and 312 gram panchayats in the district.

Other than the municipality areas, each subdivision contains community development blocks which in turn are divided into rural areas and census towns. In total there are 118 urban units: 7 municipalities and 111 census towns.

Alipore Sadar Subdivision

The Alipore Sadar subdivision consists of:
 Three municipalities: Maheshtala, Budge Budge and Pujali.
 Bishnupur I, a community development block consisting of rural areas with eleven gram panchayats and four census towns: Daulatpur, Bhasa, Bishnupur and Kanyanagar.
 Bishnupur II, a community development block consisting of rural areas with eleven gram panchayats and eleven census towns: Nahazari, Nadabhanga, Kanganbaria, Bora Gagangohalia, Chanddandaha, Barkalikapur, Patharberia, Ramkrishnapur, Amtala, Kriparampur and Chak Enayetnagar.
 Budge Budge I, a community development block consisting of rural areas with six gram panchayats and seven census towns: Uttar Raypur, Balarampur, Buita, Benjanhari Acharial (P), Abhirampur, Nischintapur and Birlapur.
 Budge Budge II, a community development block consisting of rural areas with eleven gram panchayats and five census towns: Chak Kashipur, Chak Alampur, Bowali, Dakshin Raypur and Poali.
 Thakurpukur Maheshtala, a community development block consisting of rural areas with six gram panchayats and nine census towns: Joka, Chata Kalikapur, Ganye Gangadharpur, Rameswarpur, Asuti, Hanspukuria, Kalua, Ramchandrapur and Samali.

Baruipur Subdivision

The Baruipur subdivision consists of:
 Three municipalities: Rajpur Sonarpur, Baruipur and Jaynagar Majilpur.
 Baruipur, a community development block consisting of rural areas with nineteen gram panchayats and twelve census towns: Petua, Garia, Panchghara, Mallikpur, Hariharpur, Champahati, Solgohalia, Naridana, Baruipur (P), Salipur (P), Khodar Bazar and Komarhat.
 Bhangar I, a community development block consisting of rural areas with nine gram panchayats and three census towns: Maricha, Bhangar Raghunathpur and Gobindapur.
 Bhangar II, a community development block consisting of rural areas with only ten gram panchayats.
 Jaynagar I, a community development block consisting of rural areas with twelve gram panchayats and six census towns: Raynagar, Kalikapur Barasat, Baharu, Uttarparanij, Alipur and Uttar Durgapur.
 Jaynagar II, a community development block consisting of rural areas with ten gram panchayats and two census towns: Nimpith and Tulshighata.
 Kultali, a community development block consisting of rural areas with only nine gram panchayats.
 Sonarpur, a community development block consisting of rural areas with eleven gram panchayats and seven census towns: Radhanagar, Danga, Ramchandrapur, Bidyadharpur, Kalikapur, Chak Baria and Sahebpur.

Canning Subdivision

The Canning subdivision consists of: 
 Basanti, a community development block consisting of rural areas with thirteen gram panchayats and one census town: Basanti.
 Canning I, a community development block consisting of rural areas with ten gram panchayats and eight census towns: Kalaria, Gaur Daha, Banshra, Rajapur, Taldi, Bayarsingh, Matla and Dighirpar.
 Canning II, a community development block consisting of rural areas with nine gram panchayats and one census town: Makhal Tala.
 Gosaba, a community development block consisting of rural areas with only fourteen gram panchayats.

Diamond Harbour Subdivision

The Diamond Harbour subdivision consists of:
 One municipality: Diamond Harbour
 Diamond Harbour I, a community development block consisting of rural areas with eight gram panchayats and four census towns: Masat, Sangrampur, Mohanpur and Durganagar.
 Diamond Harbour II, a community development block consisting of rural areas with eight gram panchayats and one census town: Patdaha.
 Falta, a community development block consisting of rural areas with thirteen gram panchayats and four census towns: Hasimnagar, Baneshwarpur, Chandpala Anantapathpur and Fatepur.
 Kulpi, a community development block consisting of rural areas with fourteen gram panchayats and two census towns: Berandari Bagaria and Dhola.
 Magrahat I, a community development block consisting of rural areas with eleven gram panchayats and nine census towns: Ajodhyanagar, Sirakol, Uttar Bishnupur, Ghola Noapara, Usthi, Barijpur, Uttar Kusum, Kalikapota and Bamna.
 Magrahat II, a community development block consisting of rural areas with fourteen gram panchayats and eight census towns: Dhamua, Shyampur, Nainan, Uttar Kalas, Dihi Kalas, Swangrampur, Bilandapur and Magrahat.
 Mandirbazar, a community development block consisting of rural areas with ten gram panchayats and three census towns: Chandpur, Bangsidharpur and Purba Bishnupur.
 Mathurapur I, a community development block consisting of rural areas with ten gram panchayats and four census towns: Purba Ranaghat, Lalpur, Krishna Chandrapur and Mathurapur.
 Mathurapur II, a community development block consisting of rural areas with only eleven gram panchayats.

Kakdwip Subdivision

The Kakdwip subdivision consists of: 
 Kakdwip, a community development block consisting of rural areas with only eleven gram panchayats.
 Namkhana, a community development block consisting of rural areas with only seven gram panchayats.
 Patharpratima, a community development block consisting of rural areas with only fifteen gram panchayats.
 Sagar, a community development block consisting of rural areas with only nine gram panchayats.

Representation

Parliamentary Constituencies
The district has five parliamentary constituencies:
Jaynagar (SC) (parliamentary constituency no. 19)
Mathurapur (SC) (parliamentary constituency no. 20)
Diamond Harbour (parliamentary constituency no. 21)
Jadavpur (parliamentary constituency no. 22)
Kolkata Dakshin (parliamentary constituency no. 23)

Assembly Constituencies

1997 to 2008
Based on the 1991 census, the district was divided into thirty-two legislative assembly constituencies
Gosaba (SC) (assembly constituency no. 100)
Basanti (SC) (assembly constituency no. 101)
Kultali (SC) (assembly constituency no. 102)
Jaynagar (assembly constituency no. 103)
Baruipur (assembly constituency no. 104)
Canning Paschim (SC) (assembly constituency no. 105)
Canning Purba (assembly constituency no. 106)
Bhangar (assembly constituency no. 107)
Sonarpur (SC) (assembly constituency no. 109)
Bishnupur Purba (SC) (assembly constituency no. 110)
Bishnupur Paschim (assembly constituency no. 111)
Behala Purba (assembly constituency no. 112)
Behala Paschim (assembly constituency no. 113)
Garden Reach (assembly constituency no. 114)
Maheshtala (assembly constituency no. 115)
Budge Budge (assembly constituency no. 116)
Satgachhia (assembly constituency no. 117)
Falta (assembly constituency no. 118)
Diamond Harbour (assembly constituency no. 119)
Magrahat Paschim (assembly constituency no. 120)
Magrahat Purba (SC) (assembly constituency no. 121)
Mandirbazar (SC) (assembly constituency no. 122)
Mathurapur (assembly constituency no. 123)
Kulpi (SC) (assembly constituency no. 124)
Patharpratima (assembly constituency no. 125)
Kakdwip (assembly constituency no. 126)
Sagar (assembly constituency no. 127)
Jadavpur (assembly constituency no. 108)
Tollyganj (assembly constituency no. 150)
Alipore (assembly constituency no. 148)
Dhakuria (assembly constituency no. 151)
Kabitirtha (assembly constituency no. 147)
Gosaba, Basanti, Kultali, Canning Paschim, Sonarpur, Bishnupur Purba, Magrahat Purba, Mandirbazar and Kulpi constituencies are reserved for Scheduled Castes (SC) candidates. Along with one assembly constituency from North 24 Parganas district, Gosaba, Basanti, Kultali, Jaynagar, Canning Paschim and Canning Purba assembly constituencies form the Jaynagar (Lok Sabha constituency), which is reserved for Scheduled Castes (SC). Baruipur, Bishnupur Purba, Kabitirtha, Jadavpur, Behala Paschim, Behala Purba and Magrahat Paschim constituencies form the Jadavpur (Lok Sabha constituency). Bishnupur Paschim, Garden Reach, Maheshtala, Budge Budge, Satgachhia, Falta and Diamond Harbour constituencies form the Diamond Harbour (Lok Sabha constituency). Magrahat Purba, Mandirbazar, Mathurapur, Kulpi, Patharpratima, Kakdwip and Sagar constituencies form the Mathurapur (Lok Sabha constituency), which is reserved for Scheduled Castes (SC). Along with six assembly segments from North 24 Parganas district, Bhangar assembly constituency forms the Basirhat (Lok Sabha constituency). Along with three assembly constituencies from Kolkata district, Alipore, Dhakuria, Tollyganj, Sonarpur form the Kolkata Dakshin (Lok Sabha constituency).

2008 to Date
In the 2008 order of the Delimitation Commission in respect of the delimitation of constituencies in the West Bengal, the district was divided into thirty-one assembly constituencies. Baruipur Purba, Basanti, Bishnupur, Canning Paschim, Gosaba, Kultali, Jaynagar, Magrahat Purba and Mandirbazar constituencies are reserved for Scheduled Castes (SC) candidates.

Demographics

According to the 2011 census of India, South 24 Parganas district had a total population of 8,161,961, roughly equal to the nation of Honduras or the US state of Virginia. This made in the 6th most populous district in India out of a total of 640. Its population growth rate over the decade 2001–2011 was 18.05%. South 24 Parganas had a sex ratio of 949 females for every 1000 males, and a literacy rate of 78.57%. Scheduled Castes and Scheduled Tribes made up 24,64,032 (30.19%) and 96,976 (1.19%) of the population respectively.

Religion 

Hindus are the majority community in most of the district. Scheduled Castes make up nearly half the Hindu population and the majority of rural Hindus. The most populous Scheduled Castes are Poundras and Namashudras. The proportion of Hindus is maximum in the coastal south of the district, especially in the Sunderbans bordering Bangladesh.

Muslims have a greater concentration in the north and west of the district, especially in the rural areas surrounding Kolkata. There are seven Muslim-majority blocks: Bhangar I (67.38%), Bhangar II (70.49%), Canning II (67.08%), Magrahat I (50.01%), Magrahat II (57.80%), Diamond Harbour I (52.16%) and Jaynagar II (52.23%). Several other blocks have large Muslim minorities: Budge Budge I (47.39%), Bishnupur II (37.59%), Canning I (37.49%), Bauripur (36.96%), Falta (35.00%), Diamond Harbour II (39.68%), Kulpi (40.60%), Mandirbazar (37.65%), Mathurapur (40.41%), Jaynagar I (46.86%) and Basanti (44.87%). Christians are also present in small numbers, and have their highest concentration in Thakurpukur Maheshtola where they are 8.84% of the rural population.

Language 

Nearly the entire population speaks Bengali. There is a small number of Hindi speakers who live in the suburbs of Kolkata.

Flora and fauna

It shares the park with North 24 Parganas district and is also home to four wildlife sanctuaries: Haliday Island, Lothian Island, Narendrapur, and Sajnekhali.

Sundarbans, formerly Sunderbunds, is a vast tract of forest and saltwater swamp forming the lower part of the Ganges Delta and extending about  along the Bay of Bengal from the Hooghly River Estuary in the north to the Meghna River Estuary in Bangladesh in the east. The whole tract reaches inland for 100 to 130 kilometres (60– to 80 miles).

A network of estuaries, tidal rivers, and creeks intersected by numerous channels, it encloses flat, marshy islands covered with dense forests. The name Sundarbans is perhaps derived from the word meaning "forest of sundari," a reference to the large mangrove tree that provides valuable fuel. Along the coast the forest passes into a mangrove swamp; the southern region, with numerous wild animals and crocodile-infested estuaries, is virtually uninhabited. It is one of the last preserves of the Royal Bengal tiger and the site of a tiger preservation project. The cultivated northern area yields rice, sugarcane, timber, and betel nuts.

The region is also famous for some commonly domesticated livestock breeds which includes the Garole breed of sheep and China hens or Muscovy ducks, the Garole sheep is considered as the progenitor of the Booroola merino sheep and is noted for its prolific character. However, the wool of the sheep which can be a valuable natural asset does not find any use among the natives. Bakkhali beach resort, located on one of the islands jutting out into the Bay of Bengal, is gaining in popularity, with improvements in transport links with Kolkata.  The area has been declared as world heritage site by the UNESCO. Boat tours are provided at many places in the region.

Economy
Agriculture, Industry and Pisciculture are all at their peak in the district. On the west side of the district is the Falta Special Economic Zone (SEZ), which houses various types of industry.

In 2006, the Ministry of Panchayati Raj named South 24 Parganas one of the country's 250 most backward districts (out of a total of 640).

Education
South 24 Parganas district had a literacy rate of 77.51% as per the provisional figures of the census of India 2011. Alipore Sadar subdivision had a literacy rate of 81.14%, Baruipur subdivision 77.45%, Canning subdivision 70.98%, Diamond Harbour subdivision 76.26% and Kakdwip subdivision 82.04%
  
Given in the table below (data in numbers) is a comprehensive picture of the education scenario in South 24 Parganas district, with data for the year 2013–14:

.* Does not include data for portions of South 24 Parganas district functioning under Kolkata Municipal Corporation

Healthcare
The table below (all data in numbers) presents an overview of the medical facilities available and patients treated in the hospitals, health centres and sub-centres in 2014 in South 24 Parganas district.  
 

Note: The district data does not include data for portions of South 24 Parganas district functioning under Kolkata Municipal Corporation. The number of doctors exclude private bodies.

References

External links

See also
 List of districts of West Bengal
 List of districts in India

 
Districts of West Bengal
Minority Concentrated Districts in India
1986 establishments in West Bengal